Hudson Rambler is an automobile nameplate applied to two distinct vehicles:

 Small-sized car also marketed as the Nash Rambler (introduced as a Hudson in 1955)

 Large-sized car also marketed as the Rambler Six and V8 (introduced as a Hudson in 1956)

Hudson Rambler
Rambler